N. frontalis may refer to:
 Neocallimastix frontalis, a species of fungus
 Nicrophorus frontalis, a synonym for Nicrophorus germanicus, a burying beetle species
 Nonnula frontalis, the grey-cheeked nunlet, a puffbird species found in Colombia and Panama
 Nervus frontalis or Frontal nerve, the largest branch of the ophthalmic nerve (V1)

See also
 Frontalis (disambiguation)